Norman Richardson (15 April 1915 – 1991) was an English footballer who played in the Football League for New Brighton.

External links
 

1915 births
1991 deaths
Sportspeople from Consett
Footballers from County Durham
Association football defenders
English footballers
Bolton Wanderers F.C. players
New Brighton A.F.C. players
Chorley F.C. players
English Football League players